Craig William Rosslee (born 1 January 1970 in Cape Town) is a former South African association football player and manager.

Rosslee enjoyed success as a player with Cape Town Spurs, Hellenic and Santos. He made his league debut for Cape Town Spurs in 1990 and retired in 2004 due to several shoulder injuries. Rosslee was ranked among the better defenders of his time in South Africa but was not capped at international level for South Africa.

He linked up with Ajax CT as a junior coach, eventually becoming the head of the club's youth development programme and had short uneventful stints in lower divisions but can claim fame in the hot seat for his excellent run to the last eight of the prestigious ABSA Cup with the youthful Ajax reserve team before they narrowly lost to Silver Stars.

In 2007, he was appointed coach of Ajax CT.

In 2009, Rosslee left Ajax, and later that year joined the Orlando Pirates as an assistant coach.

Rosslee joined AmaZulu as manager on 30 November 2012 on a -year deal.

On 15 October 2014, Rosslee was dismissed as coach of AmaZulu.

He became the fourth manager of Moroka Swallows in March 2015, little over two months before the end of the 2014–15 season, but was unable to save them from their first ever relegation from the top division.

In 2016, Rosslee was appointed as the technical director of Cape Town City FC. He also operates as the head coach of the club's reserve team.

References

1970 births
Living people
South African soccer players
South African soccer managers
Ajax Cape Town F.C. managers
Sportspeople from Cape Town
Association football defenders
White South African people
Hellenic F.C. players
Santos F.C. (South Africa) players
AmaZulu F.C. managers